Siddeque Ahmed is an Indian National Congress politician from Assam. He is the MLA of Karimganj South constituency.

References

Living people
Indian National Congress politicians from Assam
Assam MLAs 2001–2006
Assam MLAs 2006–2011
Assam MLAs 2011–2016
Assam MLAs 2021–2026
People from Karimganj district
21st-century Bengalis
Samata Party politicians
1962 births